Natahki Lake is located in Glacier National Park, in the U. S. state of Montana.

See also
List of lakes in Glacier County, Montana

References

Lakes of Glacier National Park (U.S.)
Lakes of Glacier County, Montana